Abo Canyon (elevation 5771 ft.), also known as Abo Pass, is a mountain pass at the southern end of the Manzano Mountains of central New Mexico in the Southwest United States.

History 

From pre-Columbian times, the pass provided the most direct trading route through the mountains between the plains Indians of the Estancia Valley to the east and the Pueblo cultures of the middle valley of the Rio Grande to the west. The route these traders took led past Abo Pueblo, dating from the 14th century, strategically located near a cluster of springs on the eastern slope of the pass. The old footpath is now the Abo Pass Trail Scenic Byway (see External Links below).

The Spanish arrived in the 16th century, and used the pass as a route between the Rio Grande valley and the three “salt missions” they constructed northeast of the pass, now ruins preserved as part of the Salinas Pueblo Missions National Monument.

Railroad 

In the early 20th century, the Atchison Topeka and Santa Fe Railroad wished to find an alternative route to its existing mainline over Raton and Glorieta Passes, to avoid the gradients of up to 3.5% on these passes. The company surveyed a route through the Abo Canyon, which could be achieved with a gradient of no more than 1.25%. Known as the Belen Cutoff, the route was completed in 1908, connecting to the AT&SF system at Belen, New Mexico and at Amarillo, Texas. The Cutoff rapidly took on the bulk of the AT&SF's transcontinental freight traffic (Most of the Santa Fe's through passenger service remained on the old Raton Pass route, due to its connections in Colorado, as well as tourist traffic serving the railroad's namesake city). Passenger service through Abo Canyon ceased in 1971 with the cancellation of the San Francisco Chief, when Amtrak took over all of the Santa Fe's passenger operations.

Now part of the BNSF system and known as the Clovis subdivision of the Southern Transcon, the rail corridor is one of the most heavily trafficked routes in the western US. An average of almost 90 trains daily passed through Abo Canyon in 2006, each typically 6000 to 8000 feet in length.

The four-mile route through the canyon remained a single-track bottleneck until March 2011, when a second track was completed at a cost of $85 million.

Highway 

The Atlantic and Pacific Highway was established through the pass in 1921, and was designated as U.S. Route 60 in 1931. New Mexico State Road 47 joins the highway from Belen on the west side of the pass.

Abo Pass Trail 
On July 31, 1998, the Abo Pass Trail was made a New Mexico Scenic and Historic Byway. It is a 31 miles scenic drive through the Salt Missions area along New Mexico State Road 47 and U.S. Route 60.

References 

Benner, John “Abo Arroyo", CTC Board Railroads Illustrated, July 1996.

External links 
Abo Pass Trail

Rail mountain passes of the United States
Mountain passes of New Mexico
Transportation in Socorro County, New Mexico
Landforms of Socorro County, New Mexico
U.S. Route 60